Handball Stal Mielec is a men's handball club from Mielec, Poland, that plays in the Superliga. It serves as the Stal Mielec's sports club section.

Honours
 Polish Cup
Winners (1): 1970–71

Team

Current squad
Squad for the 2021–22 season

Goalkeepers
1  Dawid Dekarz
 12  Damian Procho
Left wingers
 11  Marko Nikolić
 94  Rafał Krupa
Right wingers
2  Paweł Wilk
9  Dawid Ruhnke
Line players
 14  Antonio Pribanić
 15  Krzysztof Misiejuk

Left backs
7  Grzegorz Sobut
 10  Łukasz Nowak
 17  Igor Graczyk
Centre backs
 18  Dzianis Valyntsau
 25  Saša Puljizović
Right backs
 19  Dzmitry Smolikau
 51  Bartosz Wojdak
 88  Oleksii Ganchev

Transfers
Transfers for the 2022–23 season

 Joining
  Tomasz Wiśniewski (GK) (from  Sandra SPA Pogoń Szczecin)
  Paweł Napierała (LW) (from  KSSPR Końskie)
  Bartosz Smoliński (LW) (from  ARGED KPR Ostrovia)
  Adam Babicz (LB) (from  Piotrkowianin)
  Patryk Gregułowski (LB) (from  Górnik Zabrze)
  Daniel Goliszewski (CB) (from  MUKS Zagłębie ZSO 14 Sosnowiec)
  Kamil Sadowski (RB) (from  Piotrkowianin) ?
  Filip Stefani (RW) (from  Gwardia Opole)
  Mateusz Kaźmierczak (P) (from  Grupa Azoty Unia Tarnów)
  Mikołaj Kotliński (P) (from  SMS Kielce)
  Damian Krzysztofik (P) (from  Chrobry Głogów)

 Leaving
  Damian Procho (GK) (to  Zagłębie Lubin)
  Rafał Krupa (LW) (to  Zagłębie Lubin)
  Marko Nikolić (LW) (to  Istres Provence HB)
  Grzegorz Sobut (LB) (to  KSZO Ostrowiec Świętokrzyski)
  Saša Puljizović (CB) (to ?)
  Oleskii Ganchev (RB) (to  CSM Bacău)
  Dzmitry Smolikau (RB) (to  Grupa Azoty Unia Tarnów)
  Bartosz Wojdak (RB) (to  Jurand Ciechanów)
  Krzysztof Misiejuk (P) (to  ARGED KPR Ostrovia)
  Antonio Pribanić (P) (to  Hapoel Rishon LeZion)

References

External links
Official website 

Polish handball clubs
Mielec
Handball clubs established in 1952
1952 establishments in Poland
Sport in Podkarpackie Voivodeship